The Smiths Is Dead is a tribute album to the 1980s' English alternative rock band the Smiths, released in 1996. It was compiled by the French cultural magazine Les Inrockuptibles and released to celebrate the 10th anniversary of 1986's The Queen Is Dead, with the same tracklist being covered. The album was released at the height of the Britpop era and contained covers by popular Britpop acts such as Supergrass, the Divine Comedy and the Boo Radleys.

The cover is of David Bradley in a promotional shot for the 1969 film adaptation of A Kestrel for a Knave, entitled Kes.

Track listing

Tribute albums
The Smiths tribute albums
1996 compilation albums
Alternative rock compilation albums